George Gillespie (1613–1648) was a Scottish theologian.

George Gillespie may also refer to:

George Alexander Gillespie (1872–1956), Ontario politician
George Lewis Gillespie Jr. (1841–1913), Medal of Honor recipient
George Gillespie (footballer) (1859–1900), Scottish footballer (Rangers FC, Queen's Park FC and Scotland)
George D. Gillespie (1810–1909), bishop of Western Michigan in the Episcopal Church